Cores, Nomes is a 1982 album by Brazilian musician Caetano Veloso. It resembles his 1981 album Outras Palavras.

The tracks "Um canto de afoxé para o Bloco do Ilê" and "Queixa" appear on the 1989 David Byrne-compiled collection Beleza Tropical.

Track listing
All songs by Caetano Veloso, except where noted otherwise
 "Queixa" – 4:26
 "Ele me deu um beijo na boca" – 7:17
 "Trem das cores" – 2:29
 "Sete mil vezes" – 2:21
 "Coqueiro de Itapoã" (Dorival Caymmi) – 2:37
 "Um canto de afoxé para o Bloco do Ilê" (Caetano Veloso/Moreno Veloso) – 3:02
 "Cavaleiro de Jorge" – 3:44
 "Sina" (Djavan) – 4:21
 "Meu bem, meu mal" – 4:03
 "Gênesis" – 2:59
 "Sonhos" (Peninha) – 3:01
 "Surpresa" (João Donato/Caetano Veloso) – 3:20

References

1982 albums
Caetano Veloso albums
Albums produced by Caetano Veloso